Gascoyne Seamount, also called Gascoyne Guyot or Gascoyne Tablemount, is a guyot in the Tasman Sea of the South Pacific Ocean.

Geography
The Tasmantid Seamount Chain has resulted from the Indo-Australian Plate moving northward over a stationary hotspot.

Geology

The seamount is about 7 million years old. Age diagnostic forms have not been recovered.

Gascoyne Seamount is named after HMAS Gascoyne, one of two ships in the Royal Australian Navy assigned to Australian programs in the International Indian Ocean Expedition, which took place from 1960 to 1965.

References

Seamounts of the Tasman Sea
Guyots
Hotspot volcanoes
Polygenetic volcanoes
Miocene volcanoes
Volcanoes of the Tasman Sea
Seamounts of the Pacific Ocean